Sony MAX was a general entertainment TV channel that was part of the DStv bouquet of Sub-Saharan India satellite channels owned by MultiChoice.

History
The Sony MAX was the local South African version and subsidiary of the Sony Entertainment Television brand, which is seen in over 100 countries worldwide. It was launched on 1 February 2011, Sony MAX delivers 24-hours of foreign entertainment series, movies and reality programmes specially made for male audiences. It is also the sister channel of African-content channel launched by Sony after inspired from the Hindi-language movie channel from India, Sony MAX which only focus on Bollywood films.

The channel, along with Sister channel Sony Channel, were discontinued on 31 October 2018 on DStv, and on 28 February 2019 on Black.

Programming
 1000 Ways to Die
 The Boondocks
 Cheaters
 Fatal Attractions
 Hardcore Pawn: Chicago
 Hole in the Wall
 Impractical Jokers
 South Beach Tow 
What Went Down (TV series) 
Takeshi's Castle

See also 
 Sony MAX (Hindi)

References

External links 
Sony MAX website

Television stations in South Africa
English-language television stations in South Africa
Sony Pictures Television
Sony Pictures Entertainment
Television channels and stations established in 2011
2011 establishments in South Africa
Television channels and stations disestablished in 2019
2019 disestablishments in South Africa
Defunct mass media in South Africa